Flame is burning gas or vapour, the visible part of fire.

Flame, flames or FLAME may also refer to:

Fire
 Eternal flame, a constantly burning flame
 Olympic flame, eternal flame used as a symbol for the Olympic Games
 Flame retardant, materials that resist fire
 Premixed flame, a flame in which the oxidizer has been mixed with the fuel before it reaches the flame front
 Flame (color), a medium scarlet hue

Fiction 
 Flames (1917 film), a 1917 British silent drama film
 Flames (1926 film), a 1926 film featuring Boris Karloff
 Flames (1932 film), a 1932 American film
 Flames (1934 film), a 1934 Chinese film
 Flame, German Shepherd dog star in 1946 film, My Dog Shep
 Flames (TV series), a 1997 Filipino drama anthology series, and its film adaptation
 Flame (1975 film), a 1975 South Korean film
 Flame (1996 film), a 1996 Zimbabwean film
 Slade in Flame, a 1975 film also known as Flame and starring members of the British rock group Slade
 Flame (Sunwoo novel), a 1957 Korean novel by Swon Wu Hee
 Flame (comics), a comic book character created in the 1930s
 Flame (Marvel Comics), a Marvel Comics character
 A character in the cartoon Spider Riders
 Fall of a Kingdom, a novel by Hilari Bell, previously named Flame
 Princess Flame, a character in the TV series Blazing Dragons

Music

Artists
 Flame (band), Japanese hip-hop group
 Flame (rapper) (born 1981), American Christian hip-hop artist
 The Flames, a 1960s South African pop/rock group

Albums
 Flame (Richard Barbieri and Tim Bowness album), 1994
 Flame (Johnny Duhan album), 1996
 Flame (Patti LaBelle album), 1997
 Flame (Real Life album), 1985
 Flame (Ronnie Laws album), 1978

Songs
 "Flame" (Sebadoh song), 1999
 "Flame" (Claire Sproule song), 2005
 "Flame" (Bell X1 song), 2006
 "Flame" (Sundara Karma song), 2015
 "Flame" (Tinashe song), 2017
 "Flames" (David Guetta and Sia song), 2018
 "Flames" (R3hab, Zayn and Jungleboi song), 2019
 "Flames" (SG Lewis song), 2019
 "Flame" (Laine Hardy song), 2019
 "Flames", by Red Fang from Only Ghosts, 2016

Computers and technology
 Flame (robot), an experimental walking robot
 Flame (malware), computer malware discovered in May 2012
 Flaming (Internet), a message sent over the internet with the deliberate intent to insult
 Fractal flame, a group of fractals developed in 1992
 A type of visual effects software by Autodesk
 O2 Xda or Xda Flame, a smartphone by O2
 FLAME clustering, a data clustering algorithm

Species names 
 Flame (moth), a species of noctuid moth
 Flame skimmer, type of dragonfly
 Flame maple, type of maple tree
 Flame robin, type of robin
 Dryas iulia, flame butterfly

Pseudonyms 
 D-Flame (born 1971), German musician
 Penny Flame (born 1983), screen name of Jennifer Ketcham, former American adult actress and reality TV star

Organizations
 FLAME University, private liberal arts and management university in Pune, India
 Facts and Logic About the Middle East (FLAME), a pro-Israel organization
 Former Local Authority Members Éire, Irish political lobby

Sports teams
 Liberty Flames, the athletics teams of Liberty University
 Calgary Flames, Canadian ice hockey team
 Atlanta Flames, original name of the Calgary Flames
 UIC Flames, the athletics teams of University of Illinois at Chicago
 Guildford Flames, English ice hockey team
 Westchester Flames F.C., American football (soccer) team
 Canterbury Flames, New Zealand netball team
 Florida Flame, American basketball team
 Malawi national football team, nicknamed "The Flames"

Other
 Flame Nebula, an emission nebula in Orion's Belt
 Flame polishing, a method of polishing materials using flames or heat
 Flame cell, a type of cell found in invertebrates
 Flame (chimpanzee), an individual chimpanzee
 Flame, a female member of the TV show American Gladiators
 Flame, a female member of the TV show UK Gladiators

See also 
 Flam (disambiguation)
 Flaming (disambiguation)
 Flame tree (disambiguation)
 Big Flame (disambiguation)
 The Flame (disambiguation)
 Flamme (disambiguation)